Jiǔcài hézi (also ) is a type of Chinese savory pocket pie, originating from Shandong, China. It is traditionally eaten to celebrate the Chinese New Year.

Description 
Its dough is made from flour and water, with leavened and unleavened varieties. The stuffing typically includes chopped garlic chives, scrambled eggs, sauteed mini-shrimp and cellophane noodles. There is also a variety with minced meat as stuffing. The stuffing will be put in the middle of a flat dough, and then folded into half-moon shape. The finished turnover is usually pan-fried instead of baked in the oven like a turnover, and is served with black rice vinegar and sesame oil mixture as dip.

See also 
 Cheburek

References 

Chinese cuisine